Forillonaria is a genus of trilobites in the order Phacopida, that existed during the lower Devonian in what is now Canada. It was described by Lesperance in 1975, and the type species is Forillonaria russelli. The type locality was the Grand Grève Formation in Quebec.

References

External links
 Forillonaria at the Paleobiology Database

Dalmanitidae
Phacopida genera
Fossil taxa described in 1975
Devonian trilobites of North America
Fossils of Canada
Paleontology in Quebec